Presidential elections were held in Slovakia on 15 May 1999, with a second round on 29 May. Following a constitutional amendment in 1998 that introduced direct presidential elections for the first time, they resulted in a victory for Rudolf Schuster, who received 57.2% of the vote in the run-off.

Results

References

External links
Tables of official results

Presidential elections in Slovakia
Slovakia
1999 in Slovakia
May 1999 events in Europe